Liu Chuang may refer to:

 Liu Chuang (artist) (born 1979), Chinese artist
 Liu Chuang (judoka) (born 1974), Chinese judoka
 Liu Chuang (snooker player) (born 1990), Chinese snooker player